Penguin Point may refer to a number of places in the Antarctic:
 Penguin Point (Coronation Island)
 Penguin Point (George V Land)
 Penguin Point (Seymour Island)
 Penguin Point (restaurant chain)